Brewing Up with Billy Bragg is the second album by Billy Bragg, released in 1984.

While his debut album Life's a Riot with Spy vs Spy (1983) was performed by Bragg accompanied only by his guitar, Brewing Up with Billy Bragg began to use subtle overdubs, such as backing vocals on "Love Gets Dangerous", trumpet on "The Saturday Boy" and organ on "A Lover Sings".

The album also continued Bragg's legacy of political songs. "It Says Here" is a bitingly satirical attack on the British tabloid press and "Island of No Return" is a concise anti-war anthem.

The album reached number 16 on the UK albums chart.

The cover of the original album has the subtitle "A Puckish Satire on Contemporary Mores," a quote from the Woody Allen film Love and Death, in which Allen's character reviews an army play presented to Russian soldiers to prevent them from becoming infected with venereal diseases while at war.

Versions
The album was originally released on vinyl in 1984 with 11 tracks. In 1987 the album was again released along with the album Life's a Riot with Spy vs Spy (1983) and the EP Between the Wars (1985) and titled Back to Basics. Back to Basics was reissued in 1990. Brewing Up with Billy Bragg was reissued on its own in 1997.

In 2006, as part of a planned series of reissues of albums in his back catalogue, Brewing Up with Billy Bragg was remastered and reissued for the first time on CD with a number of bonus tracks. These tracks included covers of "Back to the Old House" by The Smiths (with Smiths guitarist Johnny Marr playing guitar) and "The Last Time" by The Rolling Stones. The bonus tracks also include the Between the Wars EP.

Reception

Brewing Up with Billy Bragg was ranked number six among the "Albums of the Year" for 1984 by NME.

In 2000, Q placed Brewing Up with Billy Bragg at number 87 on its list of the "100 Greatest British Albums Ever".

Track listing
All songs written by Billy Bragg, except where noted.

Disc one
"It Says Here" – 4:18
"Love Gets Dangerous" – 2:23
"The Myth of Trust" – 2:54
"From a Vauxhall Velox" – 2:31
"The Saturday Boy" – 3:30
"Island of No Return" – 3:37
"St Swithin's Day" – 3:54
"Like Soldiers Do" – 2:39
"This Guitar Says Sorry" – 2:31
"Strange Things Happen" – 2:38
"A Lover Sings" – 3:54

Disc two (2006 reissue)
"It Must Be a River" – 2:19
"I Won't Talk About It" – 5:06
"Talking Wag Club Blues" – 2:59
"You Got the Power" (James Brown, George Terry) – 3:10
"The Last Time" (Mick Jagger, Keith Richards) – 2:55
"Back to the Old House" (Morrissey, Johnny Marr) – 2:53
"A Lover Sings" (alternative version) – 3:58
"Which Side Are You On?" (Florence Reece, Bragg) – 2:34
"It Says Here" (alternate version) – 2:36
"Between the Wars" – 2:30
"The World Turned Upside Down" (Leon Rosselson) – 2:35

Personnel

Musicians
Billy Bragg – vocals, guitar
Dave Woodhead – trumpet
Kenny Craddock – organ

Production
Edward de Bono – producer
Kenny Jones – engineer
Tim Young – digitally remastered by
Duncan Cowell – digitally remastered by
Heeps Willard - cover illustration

Footnotes

References
Official Billy Bragg discography
2006 reissue CD liner notes

Billy Bragg albums
1984 albums
Go! Discs albums
Cooking Vinyl albums